This article lists fellows of the Royal Society who were elected on 9 May 2018.

Fellows of the Royal Society (FRS)

 Jim Al-Khalili
 Polly Arnold
 Jillian Banfield
 Margaret Brimble
 Neil Brockdorff
 Frank Caruso
 Vincenzo Cerundolo
 Kevin Costello
 Robert H. Crabtree
 Alexander Dawid
 Peter Dayan
 Richard Dixon
 Gregory Edgecombe
 Wenfei Fan
 Roger Goody
 Robin Grimes
 Gregory Hannon
 Demis Hassabis
 Judy Hirst
 Graeme Jameson
 Harren Jhoti
 Sophien Kamoun
 Andrew King
 Dimitri Kullmann
 Dominic Kwiatkowski
 Richard Marais
 Cathie Martin
 Elon Musk
 Peter O'Hearn
 Vassilis Pachnis
 Tracy Palmer
 Colin Prentice
 Lalita Ramakrishnan
 Nancy Reid
 Graham Richards
 David Richardson
 Sheila Rowan
 Ingrid Scheffer
 Michelle Simmons
 John Smol
 Timothy Softley
 John Speakman
 Graeme Stephens
 Angela Strank
 Charles Swanton
 Peter Visscher
 Guy Wilkinson
 Geordie Williamson
 Daniel Wise
 Nikolay Zheludev

Honorary fellows
 David Willetts (Baron Willetts of Havant)

Foreign members of the Royal Society (ForMemRS)

 Carolyn Bertozzi
 Martin Chalfie
 Sebsebe Demissew
 Jeffrey Friedman
 Fabiola Gianotti
 Albrecht Hofmann
 Butler Lampson
 Tullio Pozzan
 Joachim Sauer
 Adi Shamir

References

2018
2018 in the United Kingdom
2018 in science